Deepa Khandakar (born 28 November) is a Bangladeshi television actress. She mainly acts in television dramas while also appears in films and commercials. Among her notable films is Bhaijan Elore (India).

Early life and career
Khandakar spent her childhood at Narayanganj. Before starting her acting career, she served as a flight attendant. She debuted in acting in the television play Kaktarua.

Her popular tel-dramas include 'Meghe Dhaka Manus', 'Ebong Ami', 'Andhakare Phul', 'Ghar Sangsar', 'Mohua', 'Swapnabhog', 'Society', 'Sakkhi Kutum', among many others. She has also received immense praise for her role as a presenter in TV show titled 'House Wife'. The program was aired on Channel 24. Deepa Khandakar appeared in a Canadian feature film A Father's Diary directed by Golam Mustofa, acting as mother in a supporting role.

Khandakar has done television commercials for companies including Swan Foam, Aarong, Lipton Tazaa Tea, Starship, Cute Powder, Tibet, and Tibet Coconut Oil.

Khandakar debuted in film acting through Bhaijaan Elo Re (2018).

Personal life
Khandakar married actor  Shahed Ali in 2006. They have a son named Aadrik and a daughter named Aarohi .

Works

Films

Short films

Television dramas

References

External links

Living people
Bangladeshi television actresses
Year of birth missing (living people)
Place of birth missing (living people)